Feiyu Show is a 2014 Chinese documentary film directed by Sun Hong. It was released in China on October 23, 2014.

Cast
Xiaofei
Yu Zhou

Reception
As of October 28, the film had earned ¥0.23 million at the Chinese box office.

References

2014 documentary films
Chinese documentary films